Tiélé  is a village and rural commune in the Cercle of Kati in the Koulikoro Region of south-western Mali. The commune has an area of approximately 586 square kilometers and includes 13 villages. In the 2009 census it had a population of 18,696. The village of Tiélé is 70 km southeast of Bamako, the Malian capital.

References

Communes of Koulikoro Region